Down in the Cellar is the fourteenth studio album by Al Stewart, released in 2000 in Europe by EMI. It was released in 2001 by Miramar in the US. It was re-released in 2007 with bonus tracks by Collectors' Choice Music.

Its primary theme is that of wine, and almost all the songs on the album refer to various varieties of the alcoholic beverage, including Chardonnay and Shiraz.

Track listing
All tracks by Al Stewart except where noted.

 "Waiting for Margaux" – 4:35
 "Tasting History" (Laurence Juber, Stewart) – 4:05
 "Down in the Cellars" – 3:10
 "Turning It into Water" – 4:36
 "Soho" (Bert Jansch) – 4:00
 "The Night That the Band Got the Wine" – 6:09
 "Millie Brown" – 2:40
 "Under a Wine-Stained Moon" – 3:34
 "Franklin's Table" – 4:24
 "House of Clocks" – 3:00
 "Sergio" – 3:20
 "Toutes les Etoiles" – 2:11
 "The Shiraz Shuffle" (Juber, Stewart) – 1:55

2007 Re-release bonus tracks
 "Dark Side"
 "Belsize Blues"

Personnel 
Simon Boswell – viola
Ramon Breton – mastering assistant
Steve Chapman – management
Jim Cox – piano, organ
Bruce Dukov – violin
Joe Gastwirt – mastering
Dominic Genova – electric bass, bass
Jimmy Hoyson – assistant
David P. Jackson – accordion ("Sergio")
Michael Jochum – percussion, drums
Laurence Juber – acoustic guitar, arranger, electric guitar, producer, engineer
Avi Kipper – engineer
David Low – cello
Rachel Purkin – violin
Lori Stoll – photography
Peter White – accordion ("Toutes Les Etoiles")

Sources 
 Down in the Cellar at www.alstewart.com

Al Stewart albums
2000 albums
Albums recorded at Capitol Studios